Claudio Ezequiel Aquino (born 24 July 1991) is an Argentine professional footballer who plays as a winger or midfielder  for Paraguayan Primera División club Cerro Porteño.

References

External links

1991 births
Living people
People from Adrogué
Argentine expatriate footballers
Argentine footballers
Expatriate footballers in Brazil
Association football midfielders
Argentine Primera División players
Campeonato Brasileiro Série A players
Ferro Carril Oeste footballers
Godoy Cruz Antonio Tomba footballers
Club Atlético Independiente footballers
Fluminense FC players
Club Atlético Belgrano footballers
Unión de Santa Fe footballers
Sportspeople from Buenos Aires Province